The 2019 Africa U-17 Cup of Nations was the 13th edition of the Africa U-17 Cup of Nations (18th edition if tournaments without hosts are included), the biennial international youth football tournament organized by the Confederation of African Football (CAF) for players aged 17 and below. In May 2015, it was decided that the tournament would be hosted by Tanzania.

Four teams of the tournament qualified for the 2019 FIFA U-17 World Cup in Brazil as the CAF representatives. Cameroon won their second title.

Angola and Nigeria qualified for finishing third and fourth in the competition respectively. Defending champions Mali failed to qualify.

Following completion of the tournament, CAF ejected Guinea from the competition, and deleted its results from the records, for fielding players with passports which had a different date of birth to those the players had used in the U-16 age restricted 'International Dream Cup' in Japan. Senegal were given the remaining place at the U-17 World Cup as they had placed behind Guinea during the group stage.

Qualification

The CAF decided in July 2017 that the format of the qualifying competition should be changed and split according to zones. The qualifiers were played between 19 July and 18 September 2018. At the end of the qualification phase, seven teams joined the hosts Tanzania.

Player eligibility
Players born 1 January 2002 or later were eligible to participate in the competition.

Qualified teams
The following eights teams qualified for the final tournament.

Note: All appearance statistics count only those since the introduction of final tournament in 1995.

Venues
The matches were played in two venues.

Squads

Each squad can contain a maximum of 21 players.

Draw
The draw of the final tournament was held on 20 December 2018, 19:30 EAT (UTC+3), at the Mlimani City Conference Centre in Dar es Salaam. The eight teams were drawn into two groups of four teams. The hosts Tanzania were seeded in Group A and allocated to position A1, while 2017 third place Guinea were seeded in Group B and allocated to position B1 (2017 champions and runners-up Mali and Ghana did not qualify). The remaining six teams were seeded based on their results in the 2017 Africa U-17 Cup of Nations (final tournament and qualifiers), and drawn to any of the remaining three positions in each group.

Match officials
A total of 13 referees and 14 assistant referees were appointed for the tournament, including one women referee and two women assistant referees, which is the first time women officials were appointed in a CAF men's tournament.

Referees
 Nabil Boukhalfa (Algeria)
 Issa Sy (Senegal)
 Tsegay Mogos Teklu (Eritrea)
 Abdoul Karim Twagiramukiza (Rwanda)
 Ahmed Mahrous Hassan El Ghandour (Egypt)
 Samir Guezzaz (Morocco)
 Dahane Beida (Mauritania)
 Mashood Ssali (Uganda) 
 Pierre Atcho (Gabon)
 Blaise Yuven Ngwa  (Cameroon)
 Abdulwahid Huraywidah (Libya)
 Andofetra Rakotojaona (Madagascar)
 Jonesia Rukyaa Kabakama (Tanzania)

Assistant Referees
 Eric Ayimavo (Benin)
 Habib Judicael Sanou (Burkina Faso)
 Adam Brahim Ahmat (Chad)
 Salah  Abdi Mohamed (Djibouti)
 Nouha Bangoura (Senegal)
 Youssef El-Bosaty (Egypt)
 Mrs Mary Njoroge (Kenya)
 Mrs Lidwine Rakotozafinoro (Madagascar) 
 Abelmiro Dos Reis Montenegro (São Tomé and Príncipe)
 James Emile (Seychelles)
 Omer Hamid Ahmed (Sudan)
 Mohamed Mkono (Tanzania)
 Khalil Hassani (Tunisia)
 Thomas Kusosa (Zimbabwe)

Group stage
The top two teams of each group advance to the semi-finals and qualify for the 2019 FIFA U-17 World Cup.

Tiebreakers
Teams were ranked according to points (3 points for a win, 1 point for a draw, 0 points for a loss), and if tied on points, the following tiebreaking criteria were applied, in the order given, to determine the rankings (Regulations Article 72):
Points in head-to-head matches among tied teams;
Goal difference in head-to-head matches among tied teams;
Goals scored in head-to-head matches among tied teams;
If more than two teams are tied, and after applying all head-to-head criteria above, a subset of teams are still tied, all head-to-head criteria above are reapplied exclusively to this subset of teams;
Goal difference in all group matches;
Goals scored in all group matches;
Drawing of lots.

All times are local, EAT (UTC+3).

Group A

Group B

Knockout stage
In the knockout stage, penalty shoot-out (no extra time) was used to decide the winner if necessary (Regulations Article 73).

Bracket

Semi-finals

Third place match

Final

Winners

Awards
The following awards were given at the conclusion of the tournament:

Goalscorers

Qualified teams for FIFA U-17 World Cup
The following four teams from CAF qualified for the 2019 FIFA U-17 World Cup.

1 Bold indicates champions for that year. Italic indicates hosts for that year.

Concerns and controversies
Following Morocco's loss to Cameroon in the group stage, the Royal Moroccan Football Federation lodged a complaint with CAF over allegations that Cameroon had fielded over-age players and falsified documents. The case was dismissed due to insufficient evidence.
Following Senegal's loss to Guinea in the group stage, the Senegalese Football Federation lodged a complaint with CAF over allegations that Guinea had fielded over-age players and falsified documents, and the Nigeria Football Federation lodged a complaint with CAF following Nigeria's loss to Guinea in the semi-finals about Aboubacar Conte and Ahmed Tidiane Keita.  In 2017, Guinea had a team at the International Dream Cup in Japan: two of the players involved, Aboubacar Conte and Ahmed Tidiane Keita been registered with a date of birth that would make those players ineligible for the competition. After both complaints were upheld, Guinea was ejected from the competition, being replaced by Senegal for the 2019 FIFA U-17 World Cup spot.

Guinean Football Federation punishment 

CAF imposed the following penalties on the Guinean Football Federation:
 Guinea's representative team were excluded from the 2019 FIFA U-17 World Cup, and the team was also barred from entering the next two editions of the competition.
 The Guinean Football Federation was also fined $50,000 USD, with a further $50,000 USD fine (in addition to any other penalty) should a similar incident reoccur within the next four years.
 CAF ejected Guinea from the competition, with its results being deleted from the records, and requested the return of the runners-up medals: failure to do so would result in an additional fine of $20,000 USD.
 The two players with falsified documents, Aboubacar Conte and Tidiane Keita, and the Guinean Football Federation official who filed these falsified documents, were all banned from involvement in football for two years.

References

External links
Total U-17 Africa Cup Of Nations , Tanzania 2019, CAFonline.com

 
U-17 Cup of Nations
Africa U-17 Cup of Nations
2019 FIFA U-17 World Cup qualification
2019
2019 Africa U-17 Cup of Nations
April 2019 sports events in Africa
2019 in Tanzanian sport